SLNS Sayurala pennant number P623 (Sayurala, in English: Sea Waves) is the flagship and an advanced offshore patrol vessel (AOPV) of the Sri Lanka Navy. It is the sister ship of SLNS Sindurala.

In February 2014 contract was signed by Government of Sri Lanka and Goa Shipyard for the two Advanced Offshore Patrol Vessels (AOPVs) for the Sri Lanka Navy and the production of the first AOPV began on 15 May 2014. The Keel of the vessel was laid on 10 September 2014 and was ceremonially launched on 10 June 2016.

Operations

After the Sri Lanka Navy received the ship, it has been equipped with the Israeli Intercepting Equipment.

As its first deployment Sayurala took part in Southeast Asian Nations (ASEAN) International Fleet Review 2017 in Thailand. This is the longest foreign tour (21 days) an SLN Ship undertook after the year 1965 with 127 sailors including 18 officers.

In 2018, Sayurala took part SLINEX 2018 together with SLNS Samudura, SLNS Suranimala, INS Sumitra.

In February, 2019 Sayurala took part Aman Naval Exercise in Karachi, Pakistan and International Defense Exhibition in Abu Dhabi.

Commanding Officers
The first Sri Lankan Navy officer to Captain the ship was Captain Nishantha Amarosa.

The present commanding officer is Capt(CDO) L.A Dumindu W Abeywickrama.

Gallery

References

External links
Sri Lanka Navy

Ships of the Sri Lanka Navy
Naval ships of Sri Lanka
2016 ships
Ships built in India
Saryu-class patrol vessels of Sri Lanka